San Isidro is a town in Catamarca Province, Argentina. It is the head town of the Valle Viejo Department. It forms part of the Gran San Fernando del Valle de Catamarca urban agglomeration.

References

External links

Populated places in Catamarca Province
Populated places established in 1698
1698 establishments in the Spanish Empire
Cities in Argentina
Argentina